The Juan de Fuca Plate is an annual trophy awarded by supporters to the best semi-professional team in the Canadian province of British Columbia. The trophy is currently awarded to the League1 British Columbia club who accrues the greatest number of combined points across the men's and women's divisions. From 2012 through 2019, it was awarded to the winner of the season series of matches played between British Columbian teams in the Premier Development League (later known as USL League Two).

History
The Juan de Fuca Plate was established in January 2012 by supporters of the Victoria Highlanders and Vancouver Whitecaps U-23 (Lake Side Buoys, Vancouver Southsiders, and Curva Collective), inspired by the Voyageurs Cup and Cascadia Cup to recognize high-level soccer in the province of British Columbia. The trophy was funded through the donations of 24 fans of the two clubs to purchase the plate, which has a base made of BC maple in the shape of the province, as well as a banner to be displayed at matches. It was named after the Strait of Juan de Fuca and the Juan de Fuca Plate, which are located just off the coast of British Columbia. From its creation, the trophy was not tied to any specific league and meant to be awarded to the best British Columbia team in the top level non-professional league with multiple teams, based on their matches against each other, which at the time was the Premier Development League.

The inaugural Juan de Fuca Plate was contested between the three BC-based PDL clubs - Victoria Highlanders, Vancouver Whitecaps U23, and the Fraser Valley Mariners. The first match occurred on May 13, 2012 at Royal Athletic Park in Victoria, British Columbia between the Victoria Highlanders and the Vancouver Whitecaps U-23. Whitecaps player Tan Long scored the first goal in Juan de Fuca Plate history in the 40th minute, while the first native British Columbian to score was Ben Fisk in the second match of the Plate. The actual Plate itself debuted for the first time July 8, 2012 in the match between the Whitecaps FC and Highlanders. The Whitecaps U23 won the inaugural title.

In 2013, the Plate became a two-team tournament following the Mariners decision to drop down to the Pacific Coast League. The Whitecaps U23 once again won the title in 2013, while the Highlanders won their first title the following year in 2014. After the 2014 season, the Whitecaps U23 PDL team was disbanded due to the creation of a professional second team, Whitecaps FC 2, in USL Pro, leaving the future of the tournament uncertain, with the tournament going on hiatus for 2015 and 2016.

Following the purchase of the PDL Washington Crossfire by a Vancouver-based group in December 2016, which became the TSS FC Rovers, the Juan de Fuca Plate returned in 2017. In the revived two-team tournament in 2017, the Highlanders claimed their second title. In 2018, the TSS Rovers won their first title, defeating the Highlanders over the three legs.

In December 2019, the Victoria Highlanders announced that they will be leaving USL League Two citing possible future sanctioning issues between club and federations involved in playing in cross-border leagues, departing for the Pacific Coast Soccer League for 2020, while plans were made for League1 BC inclusion for 2021. However, the TSS Rovers and Victoria Highlanders announced that the Juan de Fuca Plate would be contested in 2020, even though both clubs were not in the same league, however, it and a possible 2021 competition were both cancelled due to the COVID-19 pandemic.

Beginning in 2022, League 1 British Columbia was established as a new semi-professional league in British Columbia (with some of the former PDL clubs joining the league - TSS Rovers, Victoria Highlanders, and the Whitecaps FC Academy). It was announced that the club whose teams accrue the greatest number of points across both the men’s and women’s divisions in an aggregate table would win the Juan de Fuca plate.

Participants

Year-by-year results

PDL era

2012

2013

2014

2017

2018

<div style=display:inline-table>

2019

L1BC era

2022

Beginning in 2022, the Juan de Fuca Plate would be awarded to the League1 British Columbia club with the highest combined point total between the men's and women's divisions.

References

External links 
Official Homepage
Official Twitter Account

Recurring sporting events established in 2012
Soccer cup competitions in Canada
Vancouver Whitecaps
Soccer rivalries in Canada
League1 British Columbia